Edward Atkyns may refer to:
Sir Edward Atkyns (judge) (1587–1669), English judge
Sir Edward Atkyns (politician) (c. 1630–1698), his son, English lawyer and politician

See also
Edward Atkyns Bray (1778–1857), English poet
Edward Atkin, UK based entrepreneur
Edward Atkinson (disambiguation)